Kaushal is a Hindu given name and surname common in India, Sri Lanka and Nepal.

List of people

Given name
 Kaushal Acharjee, Indian cricketer
 Kaushal Inamdar, Indian singer
 Kaushal Kishore, Indian politician
 Kaushal Lokuarachchi, Sri Lankan cricketer
 Kaushal Silva, Sri Lankan cricketer
 Kaushal Singh, Indian cricketer
 Kaushal Kumar Verma, Indian mathematician
 Kaushal Yadav, Indian military commander

Surname 
 Alka Kaushal, Indian actress
 Avdhash Kaushal, human rights activist
 Kamini Kaushal, Indian Actress
 Pranshu Kaushal, Indian actor
 Jagannath Kaushal, Indian politician
 Raj Kaushal, Indian director
 Swaraj Kaushal, Indian politician and lawyer
 Swati Kaushal, Indian author
 Tharindu Kaushal, Sri Lankan cricketer
 Vicky Kaushal, Indian actor
 Ashwini Kaushal, Indian Actor
 Abhinav Kaushal, Merchant Navy Officer
 Pasan Kaushal, Merchant Navy Officer Cadet

References

Hindu given names
Indian masculine given names
Indian surnames
Punjabi-language surnames